Mylochromis spilostichus is a species of cichlid endemic to Lake Malawi where it is only known from the southern portion of the lake, particularly around the Nankhumba Peninsula. This species can reach a length of  TL. This species can also be found in the aquarium trade.

References

spilostichus
Fish of Lake Malawi
Fish of Malawi
Fish described in 1935
Taxonomy articles created by Polbot